Emily Steiner is the Rose Family Endowed Chair Professor of English at the University of Pennsylvania. She is known for her work on medieval literature and middle English literature and culture.

Education and career 
Steiner has a Bachelors of Arts from Brown University and a Doctor of Philosophy from Yale University. Steiner started teaching at the University of Pennsylvania as an assistant professor in the Department of English in 1999, and was promoted to associate professor in 2005. The University of Pennsylvania raised Steiner to the role of full professor in 2015 and the Rose Family Endowed Term Professor of English in 2021, a position that she holds as of 2022.

Selected publications

References 

Living people
Year of birth missing (living people)
Brown University alumni

Yale University alumni
University of Pennsylvania faculty